Nicholas Manuel Dondas  (born 26 October 1939) is a former Country Liberal politician in the Northern Territory, Australia, representing the seat of Casuarina in the Northern Territory Legislative Assembly from 1974 to 1994, and the Division of Northern Territory in the Australian House of Representatives from 1996 to 1998.

Dondas was born in Perth, and attended Christian Brothers College, Highgate, and Perth Boys High School. He is of Greek descent. After moving to Darwin, he married Cheryl Jones on 26 August 1972, with whom he had one daughter. He was involved with the Northern Suburbs Community Development Association and the Darwin Regional Tourist Association before entering politics, and was also a keen rugby league player.

As a member of the Legislative Assembly, Dondas served as a minister from 1979 to 1987 under Paul Everingham, Ian Tuxworth and Stephen Hatton. He was deputy leader of the CLP, and hence Deputy Chief Minister, from 1983 to 1987 under Everingham and Tuxworth.

Dondas left the CLP to run unsuccessfully as an Independent for the electoral division of Port Darwin at the 2001 Northern Territory election.

References

|-

1939 births
Living people
Country Liberal Party members of the Northern Territory Legislative Assembly
Deputy Chief Ministers of the Northern Territory
Members of the Northern Territory Legislative Assembly
Members of the Australian House of Representatives
Members of the Australian House of Representatives for Northern Territory
Members of the Order of Australia
Recipients of the Australian Sports Medal
Recipients of the Centenary Medal
Speakers of the Northern Territory Legislative Assembly
Country Liberal Party members of the Parliament of Australia
20th-century Australian politicians
Australian people of Greek descent